Ronald Tierney December 12, 1944 - September 5, 2017 Born in Indianapolis, Indiana birthplace of Tierney's legendary, fictional character Dietrich (Deets) Shanahan.  After years as a writer, newspaper editor and communications director, Tierney began writing mysteries in the late 1980s.  The Stone Veil introduces semi-retired, Indianapolis-based private investigator Deets Shanahan. The first in a series of 11 novels, "The Stone Vail" was a finalist in St. Martin's Press "Best First Private Eye Novel" competition.  It was also nominated for the Private Eye Writers of America Shamus Award for "Best First Novel." After Moving to San Francisco, Tierney embarked on a second series involving the strong and passionate Carly Paladino, the lead investigator for a large, prestigious San Francisco security firm and the down on his luck, streetwise P.I. Noah Lang. Tierney was a member of the Authors Guild, Mystery Writers of America, and the Private Eye Writers of America. Tierney's novels have been published by the UK's Severn House, St. Martin's Press and Dutton (Penguin Group).

The "Deets" Shanahan Mystery Series
 The Stone Veil, 1990
 The Steel Web, 1991
 The Iron Glove, 1992
 The Concrete Pillow, 1995
 Nickel-Plated Soul, 2005
 Platinum Canary, 2005
 Glass Chameleon, 2006
 Asphalt Moon, 2007
 Bloody Palms, 2008
 Bullet Beach, 2010
 Killing Frost, 2015

The Carly Paladino / Noah Lang Mysteries
 Death in Pacific Heights, 2009
 Death in North Beach, 2010
 Mascara, Death in the Tenderloin, novella 2011
 Death in the Haight, novella 2012

Other Novels
 Eclipse of the Heart, 1993
 Good to the Last Kiss, 2011
 Blue Dragon, novella 2015

External links
 Ronald Tierney Website
 Ronald Tierney's Blog
 Dutton Guilt Edged Mysteries
 Severn House
 The Authors Guild
 Mystery Writers of America
  

1944 births
Living people
20th-century American novelists
21st-century American novelists
American male novelists
American mystery writers
Writers from Indianapolis
20th-century American male writers
21st-century American male writers
Novelists from Indiana